The S. Alexander Hinckley House is a historic First Period house in the Hyannis section of Barnstable, Massachusetts.

Description and history 
The -story Cape house was built c. 1710, and is one of a small number of early 18th-century houses in Hyannis. It is the full five bays wide and two deep, with an ell added to the rear, and a central chimney. It was also home to Ora Hinckley, the first librarian of the Hyannis Library, around the turn of the 20th century.

The house was listed on the National Register of Historic Places on September 18, 1987.

See also
National Register of Historic Places listings in Barnstable County, Massachusetts

References

External links
 MACRIS Listing - S. Alexander Hinckley House

Houses in Barnstable, Massachusetts
National Register of Historic Places in Barnstable, Massachusetts
Houses on the National Register of Historic Places in Barnstable County, Massachusetts
Houses completed in 1710
Colonial architecture in Massachusetts